Dothiora is a genus of fungi belonging to the family Dothioraceae.

The genus has almost cosmopolitan distribution.

Species

The genus Dothiora contains 54 species.

Dothiora agapanthi 
Dothiora amelanchieris 
Dothiora bupleuricola 
Dothiora buxi 
Dothiora cactacearum 
Dothiora cannabinae 
Dothiora ceratoniae 
Dothiora coronillae 
Dothiora corymbiae 
Dothiora cytisi 
Dothiora dothideoides 
Dothiora elliptica 
Dothiora ellisii 
Dothiora europaea 
Dothiora harknessii 
Dothiora hederae 
Dothiora infuscans 
Dothiora laureolae 
Dothiora lepargyrea 
Dothiora maculans 
Dothiora mahoniae 
Dothiora meynae 
Dothiora moravia 
Dothiora moravica 
Dothiora oleae 
Dothiora petrakiana 
Dothiora phaeosperma 
Dothiora phillyreae 
Dothiora pinacea 
Dothiora pistaciae 
Dothiora polyspora 
Dothiora pruni 
Dothiora pruni-padi 
Dothiora prunorum 
Dothiora rhamni-alpinae 
Dothiora ribesia 
Dothiora rimincola 
Dothiora salicis 
Dothiora sambucina 
Dothiora schizospora 
Dothiora sorbi 
Dothiora spartii 
Dothiora sphaerioides 
Dothiora sphaeroides 
Dothiora staphyleae 
Dothiora staphylina 
Dothiora stictoides 
Dothiora symploci 
Dothiora tamaricis 
Dothiora taxicola 
Dothiora thujae 
Dothiora valdiviana 
Dothiora versiformis 
Dothiora viburnicola

References

Dothideales
Dothideomycetes genera